The Virginia Commercial Historic District is a designation applied to the historic downtown of Virginia, Minnesota, United States.  It comprises 78 contributing properties built from 1900 to 1941.  It was listed as a historic district on the National Register of Historic Places in 1997 for its local significance in the theme of commerce.  It was nominated for representing an early-20th-century business district and Virginia's development as a mining boomtown and tourism gateway.

See also
 National Register of Historic Places listings in St. Louis County, Minnesota

References

Buildings and structures in Virginia, Minnesota
Commercial buildings on the National Register of Historic Places in Minnesota
Historic districts on the National Register of Historic Places in Minnesota
National Register of Historic Places in St. Louis County, Minnesota